ITV News Granada Reports is a British television news service broadcast and produced by ITV Granada.

Overview

Granada Reports is produced and broadcast from studios in the Orange Tower at MediaCityUK in Salford Quays.

Before this, the news service was based at Granada's Quay Street studios in Manchester city centre. Reporters are also based at newsrooms in the Royal Liver Building in Liverpool, Lancaster and on the Isle of Man. News staff were also based at district offices in Blackburn and Chester, until they were closed in 2005.

History
When Granada began broadcasting in May 1956, coverage of regional news and sport featured regularly within its programming, including the station's Travelling Eye outside broadcasts.

Within a year, Granada established its first regular bulletin - Northern Newscast - followed by a topical magazine programme, People and Places, noted for featuring some of the earliest television appearances by The Beatles.

In 1958, Granada broke further ground with three Travelling Eye programmes covering the Rochdale by-election.

Up until 1962, the station was also producing topical output in the Welsh language, primarily for Welsh-speaking viewers in North Wales, including daily news bulletins and a magazine programme, Dewch i Mewn (Do Come In).

People and Places was succeeded in January 1963 by the nightly Scene at 6.30. The programme was the first on British television to break news of the assassination of John F. Kennedy, following a tip-off from CBS News.

Granada continued to experiment with its regional news coverage, including late night editions of Scene, and from 1964, a new strand known as Granada in the North (later On Air), which replaced continuity junctions with national and local news summaries, features and programming previews.

Following changes to the company's franchise, including a new brief to solely cover the North West, Scene was axed in 1968 and replaced by six self-contained regional programmes, preceded by a Granada News bulletin.

Granada reverted back to a nightly magazine programme, under the name of Six-O-One, and latterly Newsday, until settling on the Granada Reports brand in 1973. During its early years, the programme spawned a number of spin-offs, including the social action series Reports Action and the North West political programme Reports Politics.

On 20 September 1978, Joy Division made their television debut on by performing Shadowplay during the "What's On" segment of Granada Reports.

In April 1986, most of Granada's regional news operation was relocated from Manchester to a computerised news centre at the former Traffic Office building in Liverpool's Albert Dock, eight years after the company had first established a news base in the city, based at Exchange Flags.

The flagship evening programme was relaunched as Granada Tonight in January 1990, before returning to the Manchester headquarters in 1992. The Albert Dock news centre continued to produce and broadcast bulletins until 1998 – the studios were finally closed in July 2006.

For much of its run, Granada Tonight placed a greater emphasis on non-news features and entertainment content, with its studio set consisting of sofas and armchairs. On 1 October 2001, the main evening programme reverted back to Granada Reports, while short bulletins continued to air as Granada News.

As of 2013, most bulletins now air under the joint branding of ITV News and Granada Reports with breakfast updates entitled Good Morning Granada.

The programme was unaffected by cutbacks to ITV regional news in early 2009. The only major change saw ITV Granada take over coverage of the Isle of Man from ITV Tyne Tees & Border on 16 July 2009.

On 27 September 2012, it was announced technical staff had been invited to volunteer for redundancy as part of national job losses affecting ITV News services. The timing coincided with production moving from Granada Studios to MediaCityUK. The first bulletin from Salford Quays, presented by Tony Morris, aired on Sunday 24 March 2013.

Current notable on air team
Mel Barham
Gamal Fahnbulleh
Mike Hall
Tori Lacey
Lucy Meacock
Amy Welch
Elaine Willcox

Former notable on air team

Gordon Burns
Gay Byrne
Martin Dougan
Stephen Douglas
Peter Eckersley
Clare Fallon
Judy Finnigan
Kerrie Gosney
Bob Greaves
Bill Grundy
Stuart Hall 
Catherine Jacob
Chris Kelly
Denis Law
Jan Leeming
Debbie Lindley 
Andrew Lindsay 
Tom McGurk
Richard Madeley
Alistair Mann 
Adam McClean 
Jon Mitchell
Tony Morris
Michael Parkinson
George Reid
Shelley Rohde
Mike Scott
Bob Smithies
Fred Talbot 
Mark Tattersall
Alan Towers 
Rachel Townsend
Brian Trueman
Dan Walker 
Elton Welsby
Anthony Wilson

Awards
BAFTA Television Awards
Best News Coverage: 2007, 2013
Royal Television Society
Best News Coverage in the Nations and Regions: 2007, 2008
Best Regional News Programme – North West: 2007, 2009, 2010, 2011, 2012, 2013
Best Regional Story – North West: 2010, 2011, 2012, 2013
Best Regional on Screen Talent – North West: 2011 (Rob Smith), 2012 (Clare Fallon)
Best Innovation in Multimedia – North West: 2012 (Adam McClean)

References

External links

Granada Reports
1956 British television series debuts
1950s British television series
1960s British television series
1970s British television series
1980s British television series
1990s British television series
2000s British television series
2010s British television series
2020s British television series
English-language television shows
ITV regional news shows
Television news in England
Television news in the Isle of Man
Television shows produced by Granada Television